Thomas Coke, 1st Earl of Leicester may refer to:

Thomas Coke, 1st Earl of Leicester (fifth creation) (1697–1759), English land owner and patron of the arts
Thomas Coke, 1st Earl of Leicester (seventh creation) (1754–1842), British politician

See also
Thomas Coke (disambiguation)